Kormisosh was a ruler of Bulgaria during the 8th century.

The Namelist of Bulgarian Rulers  states that he belonged to the Ukil (or Vokil) clan and ruled for 17 years. According to the chronology developed by Moskov, Kormisosh would have reigned from 737 to 754. Other chronologies place his reign in 753–756, but cannot be reconciled with the testimony of the "Namelist" (or would require us to assume a long period of co-regency).

The "Namelist" stresses the fact that the accession of Kormisosh represents a change of dynasty, but it remains unclear whether that was done through violence.  The reign of Kormisosh inaugurated a prolonged period of war with the Byzantine Empire.  The Byzantine Emperor Constantine V Kopronymos had begun to fortify the frontier and started settling Armenians and Syrians in Byzantine Thrace.  In response Kormisosh demanded the payment of tribute, perhaps constituting an increase in the traditional payments.  Rebuffed, Kormisosh raided into Thrace, reaching the Anastasian Wall stretching between the Black Sea and the Sea of Marmara 40 km in front of Constantinople.  Constantine V marched out with his army, defeated the Bulgarians and turned them to flight. Conflict was resolved with a peace treaty between Kormisosh and Constantine V that probably confirmed the existing frontier. It is sometimes supposed that this defeat brought the reign of Kormisosh to its end through a palace coup, but the next ruler Vinekh may have been from the same royal house.

See also
History of Bulgaria
Bulgars

References

 Mosko Moskov, Imennik na bălgarskite hanove (novo tălkuvane), Sofia 1988.
 Jordan Andreev, Ivan Lazarov, Plamen Pavlov, Koj koj e v srednovekovna Bălgarija, Sofia 1999.
 (primary source), Bahshi Iman, Djagfar Tarihi, vol. III, Orenburg 1997.

756 deaths
Monarchs of the Bulgars
8th-century Bulgarian monarchs
Bulgarian people of the Byzantine–Bulgarian Wars
Year of birth unknown